Grotella vauriae is a moth in the genus Grotella, of the family Noctuidae. The species was first described by Rowland R. McElvare in 1950. This moth species is found in North America, including Texas, its type location.

References

External links
Insect species described from Big Bend National Park, Texas

Grotella
Moths described in 1950